The Straits Times is an English-language daily broadsheet newspaper based in Singapore and currently owned by SPH Media Trust (previously Singapore Press Holdings). The Sunday Times is its Sunday edition. The newspaper was established on 15 July 1845 as The Straits Times and Singapore Journal of Commerce. The Straits Times is considered a newspaper of record for Singapore. The print and digital editions of The Straits Times and The Sunday Times have a daily average circulation of 364,134 and 364,849 respectively in 2017, as audited by Audit Bureau of Circulations Singapore. Myanmar and Brunei editions are published, with newsprint circulations of 5,000 and 2,500 respectively.

History
The original conception for The Straits Times has been debated by historians of Singapore. Prior to 1845, the only English-language newspaper in Singapore was The Singapore Free Press, founded by William Napier in 1835. Marterus Thaddeus Apcar, an Armenian merchant, had intended to start a paper, hired an editor, and purchased printing equipment from England. However the would-be editor died abruptly, prior to the arrival of the printing equipment, and Apcar went bankrupt. Fellow Armenian and friend, Catchick Moses, then bought the printing equipment from Apcar and launched The Straits Times with Robert Carr Woods, Sr., an English journalist from Bombay as editor. The paper was founded as The Straits Times and Singapore Journal of Commerce on 15 July 1845. The Straits Times was launched as an eight-page weekly, published at 7 Commercial Square using a hand-operated press. The subscription fee then was Sp.$1.75 per month. As editor, Woods sought to distinguish The Straits Times from The Singapore Free Press by including humour, short stories, and foreign news, and by making use of regular steamship services carrying mail that launched shortly before The Straits Times was launched. Historian Mary Turnbull disputes this account of The Straits Times' founding, saying that it was unlikely an Armenian merchant would have wanted to found an English-language newspaper, particularly given the presence of the more established Singapore Free Press.

In September 1846, the paper was given to Woods outright because the press proved unprofitable to run and Moses was unable to sell it. The paper struggled with a lack of subscribers and newsworthy items to coverage. Woods covered the financial deficit by using the printing press for other projects, including the first directory of Singapore, The Straits Times Almanack, Calendar and Directory, published in 1846.

The first major political stance taken by The Straits Times was against James Brooke, the Rajah of Sarawak. Woods personally resented Brooke and changed that Brooke's actions against Dayak "pirates" was a massacre of peaceful, civilian merchants. The rival Singapore Free Press came to Brooke's defence and the ensuing controversy boosted the circulation of both papers. Woods petitioned the British government for an inquest of Brooke's actions in 1851, with a commission convened in 1854. Brookes was exonerated, but the popularity of the episode made The Straits Times a success, and it became a daily newspaper in 1858.

Woods continued as editor of the paper until he sold it in 1860. John Cameron served as editor from 1861 to 1869, during which the paper nearly went out of business due to hugely destructive fire. The paper's assets were sold at public auction for $40 and Cameron went bankrupt, although he managed to revive the newspaper. Six years after Cameron's death in 1881, his widow appointed Arnot Reid, a young Scottish journalist, as editor, who then held the post for 12 years.

The Straits Times became a major reporter of political and economic events of note in British Malaya, including shipping news, civil and political unrest in Siam and Burma, official reports, and including high society news items such as tea parties held at Government House and visits from dignitaries such as the Sultan of Johor. Colonial officials, such as Frank Swettenham, wrote articles, sometimes in their own names. The paper later published Swettenham's writings on the history of Perak and his involvement in the British Residential system in 1893.

Following Reid's retirement, Alexander W. Still took over as editor, a post he held for 18 years. During Still's leadership as editor, The Straits Times built a reputation for bold reporting and fearless commentary. It was known as the "Thunderer of the East", a reference to the original Thunderer, The Times of London, and was a critic of the British colonial administration, though much milder in its criticism of the government compared to its critique of unethical businesses. Under Still's leadership, circulation (from 3,600 in 1910 to 4,100 in 1920) and ad revenues increased. Still's outspokenness as editor resulted in a number of libel suits against the paper, which were either lost or settled privately out of court. He believed that the paper had an obligation to investigate and expose corruption both in government and in business. For our own part, we cherish the liberty of the press simply for its value to the community as a whole. Nothing fills us with greater contempt than the type of journalism, unfortunately somewhat on the increase in Great Britain, which pries into private affairs, gloats over domestic scandals, and tickles the palates of the people with snappy tidbits of personality. We do not want liberty of the press extended in a form that would enable this kind of journalism to pander without fear of penalties. But in the modern constitution of society, the press has great functions to perform. It is the chief safeguard against corruption . . . our business is to do what we deem right and necessary in the public interest, and no law court can be the keeper of our conscience . . . Malaya has some reason to be proud of its press. It is honest, clean, and public-spirited. It may be wrong-headed occasionally - we may ourselves be the chief of sinners in that respect - but it puts no man or woman to the blush, and its aims are generally wholesome.Still attacked the actions of governor Laurence Guillemard on the grounds of a free press, such as back-room discussions of a proposed constitutional change that colonial administrators urged reporters to delay covering until the proposals were announced. In an editorial, Still replied, "That is mere pompous nonsense when addressed to a free people and a free press."

The Singapore Free Press, which had folded in 1869, was revived by W.G. St. Clair, who edited it until 1916. The rival newspapers spurred readership among the growing English-reading community, with The Singapore Free Press published in the morning and The Straits Times released in the afternoon. Still retired from The Straits Times in 1926 and the paper cycled through four editors in the span of two years before George Seabridge became editor in 1928. He held the position for the next 18 years and oversaw huge growth in circulation: from 5,000 to 25,000 subscribers.

The Straits Times focused predominantly on British and British-related events while ignoring the politics and socio-economic issues of concern to other groups, including the Malay, Chinese, and Indian populations in and around Singapore. Coverage of events related to non-British was typically restricted to court cases or sensationalized crimes, such as the Tok Janggut's rebellion in Kelantan in 1915. Under Still's editorship, the paper called for better working conditions for Malay, Chinese, and Indian labourers, but on the grounds that it would improve their efficiency and productivity. Still also considered the Asian population of Singapore "untrustworthy" and suggested they should not hold positions of power or serve in the military. Asian reporters at The Straits Times experienced discrimination in the workplace and while on assignment. Peter Benson Maxwell, an Indian reporter, arranged an interview with the governor Cecil Clementi via Clementi's secretary, but was quickly removed from the premises of the Government House when he arrived in person.

The paper was originally owned by the individual founders before becoming a private company, as it remained until 1950. Its single largest shareholder was the procurer of the Paris Foreign Missions Society, the Reverend N.J. Couvreur, who also served as the chairman of the company's board of the directors from 1910 to 1920.

In the 1920s and 1930s, The Straits Times began to face competition from other papers, specifically the Malaya Tribune, which promised "frank discussion of Malayan affairs" and "weekly articles by special and well-informed writers, Chinese, Indians, and Muslims". The Tribune, founded in 1914, lagged behind The Straits Times in sales and readership, and launched an advertising campaign to increase circulation and move the paper away from its image as the "clerk's paper". It also hired talented journalists, including Leslie Hoffman and T.S. Khoo, who became the editor-in-chief and deputy editor-in-chief, respectively, of The Straits Times after World War II. The efforts of the Malaya Tribune were successful when, in 1932, its circulation exceeded that of The Straits Times. In response to the competition, Seabridge improved the company by building a new office, replacing and updating old printing equipment, hiring local journalists, and beginning delivery upcountry. He also made significant changes to the paper: he expanded coverage of events in Singapore and Malaysia; created a Sunday paper; cut the price of the paper to match that of the Malaya Tribune; and incorporated pictures, comics, and other eye-catching elements to make the paper more attracted. Particularly with the reduction of cost, the number of subscribers dramatically increased.

Japanese occupation

Lead-up to occupation 
In July 1941, Prime Minister Winston Churchill appointed Duff Cooper, a former Minister of Information, to investigate how to coordinate defence policy planning in Asia against the threat of Japanese invasion. Cooper arrived in Singapore in September 1941 and reported that the various civil, governmental, and military elements did not communicate or coordinate well. Seabridge, as chief editor, was highly critical of the lack of planning and efficiency of government officials. Seabridge and F.D. Bisseker, the chairman of the Eastern Smelting Company, strongly urged Cooper to build up the civil defence; Seabridge also backed Cooper's proposal to institute martial law. Japanese attacks in the northern Malay states began on 8 December 1941, the day after the attack on Pearl Harbor. Five days later, the commander ordered the evacuation of all European women and children and all military personnel from the island of Penang. Similar evacuations of only Europeans were ordered throughout the month of December, seriously undermining the morale of the much larger Asian population of Singapore and the surrounding British areas. However, Governor Shenton Thomas insisted that the British community of Singapore must not flee in the face of the Japanese, that no racial discrimination was to take place in the evacuation of civilians, and that British civil officers stay behind to "look after their Asian charges". The government also obstructed information of the severity of the situation on the frontlines. On 5 January 1941, The Straits Times published the following lead article summarizing the situation.Malaya has now been in the front line for a month. The Northern Settlement [Penang] is in enemy hands, and fighting is taking place within 200 miles of Singapore. This island has been bombed on several occasions with 'slight damage to civilian property' and 'a few civilian casualties'. That is a reasonably accurate summary of all the people of this country have been told of the fighting that is going around them. Vague 'lines' have been mentioned and there have been sundry 'strategic withdrawals'. Such generalities provide a very flimsy basis indeed for detailed comment - so flimsy that we do not propose to attempt a task which is very nearly impossible of achievement … The view we propose to put forward here is the view of the middle-class Asiatic who has been asked to help in maintaining morale but finds himself quite unable to do so . . . If the newspapers and the newspaper-reading public are to be any help in combatting rumour, they must be supplied with the only things which are of the slightest value in carrying out the task. And those things are facts.

On 20 February 1942, five days after the Fall of Singapore, The Straits Times was renamed by Japan and became known as The Shonan Times, Shonan (昭南) being the Japanese name for Singapore. The first issue of The Shonan Times published a declaration by Tomoyuki Yamashita, announcing that the aim of the Japanese was to establish the Greater East Asia Co-Prosperity Sphere in order to achieve a "Great Spirit of Cosmocrasy" and "sweep away the arrogant and unrighteous British elements". The paper was later published as The Syonan Times, The Syonan Sinbun, and The Syonan Shimbun. The changes in the spelling arose from squabbles between adherents of different romanization systems, namely Hepburn romanization and a standard devised by the Japanese military government (i.e. General Tojo was written as Tozyo). On 8 December 1942, the anniversary of the initial Japanese invasion, the paper was published as the Syonan Sinbun, the English-language edition of a Japanese newspaper. It finally became the Syonan Shimbun on 8 December 1943.

During this period, the paper was thoroughly pro-Japanese and would often report on Japan's war efforts in the Pacific. The newspaper was run by members of the Japanese military propaganda division and included prominent writers such as Masuji Ibuse.

Seabridge and his wife fled Singapore on 11 February 1942 and went to Batavia (present-day Jakarta). From Batavia, Seabridge filed a secret report for the War Cabinet in London in April 1942 on the failure of both military and civilian governments to hold and maintain Singapore's defences.Singapore itself was in a state of almost complete chaos from the end of December. Civil Servants who had evacuated from the Malay States sought to set up temporary departments in Singapore for no other apparent reason than the preservation of their jobs. Even the FMS Income Tax Department set itself up in Singapore after the last Federated State had fallen into Japanese hands. The Civil administration cracked badly and broke completely at some points. There was little co-operation with the Services, and many indications of jealousy and fear that outsiders might poach on the preserves of the Civil Servant … The extent to which obstructionists flourished was staggering.

As a propaganda instrument 
In June 1942, the Military Propaganda Squad  launched a campaign, Nippon-Go Popularising Week, to promote the Japanese language among Singaporeans, using the Syonan Shimbun. The Propaganda Squad drafted some 150 members of the Japanese literati and assigned them to Singapore (Syonan) under the 25th Army Military Administration. These included notable authors such as the novelist Masuji Ibuse, poet Jimbo Kōtaro, and literary critic Nakajima Kenzo. A document dated 17 May 1942 outlined the four main objectives of Nippon-Go Popularising Week.

 To promote the study of Japanese during and after Nippon-Go Popularising Week, introduce the Japanese state of affairs in a series of articles, and strengthen the command of conventional Japanese language in the local papers.
 To entreat all Japanese soldiers involved in the constructive war effort to cooperate in teaching correct Japanese to natives.
 To publish a weekly children's katakana newspaper.
 To publish a guidebook on the proper pronunciation of Japanese syllables.

The children's newspaper, outlined in the third goal, was published as Sakura and included as a free supplement in the 10 June 1942 edition of the Syonan Shimbun, though it was later sold separately for one sen. In addition to the Sakura children's newspaper, the Syonan Shimbun was used by the Japanese government as a way of attempting to create pro-Japanese youth leaders among the multiethnic, multilingual children of Singapore.

Following the return of Singapore to the British after World War II, the name of the paper reverted to The Straits Times on 5 September 1945.

Post-war period 

On 11 March 1950, The Straits Times became a public limited company. by 1952, it began to actively embrace the role as the predominant newspaper of Singapore, referring to itself as the 'national' newspaper of Malaya. 1956 was also a major year for Asian contributors to The Straits Times, with journalists such as Leslie Hoffman appointed as editor-in-chief, Lee Siew Yee as the deputy editor-in-chief, and T.S. Khoo as night editor. Samad Ismail, an editor for the daily newspaper Berita Harian, joined the paper in 1963. In 1964, the managing director A.C. Simmons became the paper's chairman until his abrupt retirement in 1974 due to allegations of tax evasion.

During the Malayan Emergency, The Straits Times published cash bounties for information leading to the killing or capture of senior communists. Earlier during the Emergency, The Straits Times had erroneously reported that 26 suspected communist guerrillas had been shot dead by the British military while attempting to escape after ammunition had been discovered in their homes.  It was later discovered that 24 people had been shot dead, and that all of them were innocent civilians who had been executed as part of the Batang Kali massacre by the Scots Guards.

In 1956, The Straits Times established a Malaysian edition, The New Straits Times, based in Kuala Lumpur. Following Singapore's independence and the short-lived merged with Malaysia in 1963 that ended in 1965, the company split in two. On 1 September 1972, The Straits Times transferred its Malaysian business into a wholly owned subsidiary, the New Straits Times (Malaysia) Sdn. Bhd. The parent company of The Straits Times was converted into a separate, public company.

The news website of The Straits Times launched on 1 January 1994, making it one of the first newspapers in the world to do so. The website remained entirely free until 2005 when paid subscription became required to fully access news and commentary.

Coverage
The Straits Times functions with 16 bureaus and special correspondents in major cities worldwide. The paper has five sections: the main section consist of Asian and international news, with sub-sections of columns and editorials and the Forum Page (letters to the press). The Home section consist of local news and topics on Education for Monday, Mind and Body for Tuesday, Digital for Wednesday, Community for Thursday and Science for Friday. There are also a sports and finance section, a classified ads and job listing section and a lifestyle, style, entertainment and the arts section titled "Life!".

The newspaper also publishes special editions for primary and secondary schools in Singapore. The primary-school version contains a special pull-out, titled "Little Red Dot" and the secondary-school version contains a pull-out titled "In".

A separate edition The Sunday Times is published on Sundays.

Sale in Malaysia
Owing to political sensitivities, The Straits Times is not sold in neighboring Malaysia, and the Malaysian newspaper New Straits Times is not sold in Singapore.

International editions
A specific Myanmar and Brunei edition of this paper was launched on 25 March 2014 and 30 October 2014. It is published daily with local newspaper printers on licence with SPH. This paper is distributed on ministries, businesses, major hotels, airlines, bookshops and supermarkets on major cities and target sales to local and foreign businessmen in both countries. Circulation of the Myanmar edition currently stands at 5,000 and 2,500 for the Brunei edition. The Brunei edition is currently sold at B$1 per copy and an All-in-One Straits Times package consisting of the print edition and full digital access via online, tablets and smartphones, will also be introduced in Brunei.

Straits Times Online
Launched on 1 January 1994, The Straits Times website was free of charge and granted access to all the sections and articles found in the print edition. On 1 January 2005, the online version began requiring registration and after a short period became a paid-access-only site. Currently, only people who subscribe to the online edition can read all the articles on the Internet, including the frequently updated "Latest News" section.

A free section, featuring a selection of news stories, is currently available at the site. Regular podcast, vodcast and twice-daily—mid-day and evening updates—radio-news bulletins are also available for free online.

Preservation 
In July 2007, the National Library Board signed an agreement with the Singapore Press Holdings to digitise the archives of The Straits Times going back to its founding in 1845. The archived materials are held in the Lee Kong Chian Reference Library and are available to the public through microfilm.

Community programmes

The Straits Times School Pocket Money Fund
The Straits Times School Pocket Money Fund was initiated on 1 October 2000 by The Straits Times, to heighten public awareness of the plight of children from low-income families who were attending school without proper breakfast, or pocket money to sustain their day in school. The aim is to alleviate the financial burden faced by parents in providing for their children's education. At the same time the funds will help children who are already facing difficulties in remaining in school to stay on.

The Straits Times Schools
The Straits Times Schools is a news desk created to encourage youth readership and interest in news and current affairs. Launched in 2004, the programme was initially known as The Straits Times Media Club. Youth newspapers, IN and Little Red Dot are produced on a weekly basis for secondary and primary school students respectively, whose schools would have to subscribe in bulk. Students will receive their papers every Monday together with the main broadsheet. On 7 March 2017, a digital IN app was launched, allowing parents, students and other individual ST subscribers to subscribe to IN weekly releases digitally.

Government interference
Prior to 1965, during the early days of Singaporean self-governance, the paper had an uneasy relationship with some politicians, including the leaders of the People's Action Party (PAP). This was partially due to Hoffman criticising the PAP during the 1959 general election and supporting the eventually defeated chief minister Lim Yew Hock. Editors were warned that any reportage that may threaten the merger between Singapore and the Malayan Federation may result in subversion charges, and that they may be detained without trial under the Preservation of Public Security Ordinance Act. Following critcism of the paper's coverage from Lee Kuan Yew after the 1979 by-elections and the 1980 general election, The Straits Times agreed to accept S. R. Nathan, a government nominee and the former Director of Internal Security, as its executive chairman. Subsequently, the Singaporean government restructured the entire newspaper industry, in which all papers published in English, Chinese, and Malay were brought under Singapore Press Holdings (SPH), established on 30 November 1984. Following the establishment of the conglomerate, The Straits Times, and the other subsidiaries, were allowed to maintain its own board of directors and editorial staff.

The newspaper is sometimes referred as "the mouthpiece" of the ruling party, or at least "mostly pro-government", as well as "close to the government". Chua Chin Hon, then ST's bureau chief for the United States, was quoted as saying that SPH's "editors have all been groomed as pro-government supporters and are careful to ensure that reporting of local events adheres closely to the official line" in a 2009 US diplomatic cable leaked by WikiLeaks. Past chairpersons of Singapore Press Holdings have been civil or public servants. Current SPH Chairman Lee Boon Yang is a former PAP cabinet minister who took over from Tony Tan, former Deputy Prime Minister. Many current ST management and senior editors have close links to the government as well. SPH CEO Alan Chan was a former top civil servant and Principal Private Secretary of then Senior Minister Lee Kuan Yew. Current editor-in-chief Warren Fernandez was considered as a PAP candidate for the 2006 elections.

In his memoir OB Markers: My Straits Times Story, former editor-in-chief Cheong Yip Seng recounts how, since 1986, there has been a government-appointed "monitor" at the newspaper, "someone who could watch to see if indeed the newsroom was beyond control", and that disapproval of the "monitor" could cost a reporter or editor their job.  Cheong identifies the first monitor as S. R. Nathan, director of the Ministry of Defence's Security and Intelligence Division and later president of Singapore. Editors were bound by out of bounds markers to denote what topics are permissible for public discussion, resulting in self-censorship.

Public opinion
A 2020 Reuters Institute survey of 15 media outlets found that 73% of Singaporean respondents trusted reporting from The Straits Times which was the second highest rating next to Channel NewsAsia.

The Straits Times has also been criticised by netizens for sloppy and biased reporting. For instance, the newspaper repeatedly interviewed a commuter named Ashley Wu on 8 occasions within a span of 10 months, whenever the trains broke down, rather than getting fresh viewpoints from different affected commuters. The newspaper is also known to modify and insert additional lines to op-ed contributors' works, altering the tone and message of the articles, without notifying them in advance.

See also
 Media of Singapore
 Media censorship in Singapore
 List of newspapers in Singapore

References

Additional Sources 
 Thio, HR and the Media in Singapore in HR and the Media, Robert Haas ed, Malaysia: AIDCOM 1996 69 at 72-5.

Further reading
 Merrill, John C. and Harold A. Fisher. The world's great dailies: profiles of fifty newspapers (1980) pp 305–7
 Turnbull, C. Mary. Dateline Singapore: 150 Years of The Straits Times (1995), published by Singapore Press Holdings
 Cheong Yip Seng. OB Markers: My Straits Times Story (2012), published by Straits Times Press

External links
 
 
 
 SPH NewsLink—Archive of Straits Times Articles
 Search digitised Singapore newspapers from 1831-2013

1845 establishments in the Straits Settlements
English-language newspapers published in Asia
SPH Media Trust
Newspapers published in Singapore
Publications established in 1845